Kusići (Cyrillic: Кусићи) was formerly a subvillage of the village Jezera, Teslić, Bosnia and Herzegovina.  After the collapse and dissolution of Yugoslavia and during the war in Bosnia and Herzegovina from 1992 to 1995, reportedly all its inhabitants left their homes and moved mostly to Vojvodina, Serbia. Among the reasons for this exodus was the newly established geopolitical order in Bosnia and Herzegovina. The border between the two Bosnian "entities," i.e. the Federation of Bosnia and Herzegovina and Republika Srpska, runs through the village Jezera. Jezera's Orthodox Christian Kusići population left their homes; the area's borders have been redrawn and the village is now under the jurisdiction of the Zenica municipality, Federation of Bosnia and Herzegovina.

See also
 Jezera, a village in Teslić, Bosnia and Herzegovina.
 Kusić, disambiguation article.
 Teslić

Villages in the Federation of Bosnia and Herzegovina

Former populated places in Bosnia and Herzegovina
Populated places in Teslić
Populated places in Zenica